The Old Regular Baptist denomination is one of the oldest in Appalachia with roots in both the Regular and Separate Baptists of the American Colonies and the Particular Baptist of  Great Britain. This group has seen a marked decline in its membership during the last two decades. The Old Regular Baptist Faith and order with her many branches and factions still remains the dominant Faith in some rural Central Appalachian Counties along or near the Kentucky Virginia border.

History
The  Old Regular Baptist Churches of Jesus Christ here in the United States along with their sister Churches the Regular Primitive Baptist trace their history to Churches that sprang up in the American Colonies. These early Churches had been organized as Regular Baptist Churches and  Separate Baptist Churches in Christ and were found from New England to Georgia. A great migration took place in the American Colonies and many pioneer Baptist migrated to western parts of Virginia and into the regions of  Kentucky and Tennessee. In 1802 the North District Association was formed from the South Kentucky Association organized in 1788 the North District gave off the Burning Springs in 1813 which armed the  New Salem Association in 1825. There were churches and Associations being organized likewise in Western and  Southwestern  Virginia. In 1800 the Greenbrier Association gave off Teays Valley Association in 1812. In 1811 the Washington District Association was organized as a Regular Baptist Association, although its origins are from the Holston Association which organized in 1786 by the authority of the Sandy Creek Separate Baptist Association. The Sandy Creek Separate Baptist self-organized in  1756. The Washington District Association however upon being organized adopted the Preambles and the Constitution of the Regular Baptist.   

The Old Regular Baptist Churches of today can be likewise be traced directly or indirectly to churches who were involved with these older associations. We find others who were involved as ministers and members of the Elkhorn Association organized in 1765 the Licking Association organized in 1810 even the Philadelphia organized 1707 and the Ketockton organized on August 19th,1766, joining and organizing Churches that were to become the Old Regular Baptist.

The New Salem Association of Old Regular Baptist was established in 1825, this Association was an arm of the Burning Springs Association. The New Salem Association has undergone several name changes from Baptist to  Regular United in 1854, to Regular Primitive in 1870, to Regular Baptist in 1871 and then in 1892 to Old Regular. Names that were synonymous with " Old Regular Baptist" at least in the early history of this faith include, the Regular Predestinarian Baptist, Particular Baptist, Old School Baptist, United Baptist, Regular Primitive Baptist, and Old School or Old Order of  Regular Baptist Churches and Associations. These terms held the same general meaning and have been used interchangeably by many of the Associations mentioned. 

There have been several Old Regular Baptist Associations and many Churches that have origins other than through the New Salem Association of Old Regular Baptist. The Burning Springs Association (1813), Red Bird Association (1823),  Mountain Association (1856), Red River Association (1876) were all directly descended from the North District Association.  The Mud River Association (1888), Twin Creek Association (1850) Spencer Association (1898), and others originated from different clusters of churches and associations. In Virginia and elsewhere, some Old Regular Baptist Churches descended from the Sandy Creek Association Churches, along with Churches form the Washington Association and Three Forks of Powell Valley Association. There are Old Regular Baptist Churches that were formed from or contained members who came directly with letters from the Philadelphia and Ketocton Association's  Churches along with the Yadkin, Holston, Kehukee and  Roaring  River Association Churches. Elkhorn Regular Baptist Association of West Virginia and the Pineville Primitive Baptist Association of West Virginia.
The Twin Creek Association formed from a split in the Licking River Particular Baptist Association in 1850. The Twin Creek Association was one of the first Associations in Kentucky to title itself "Old Regular Baptist" in 1850. The churches that made up the Twin Creek Association had roots in the Elkhorn Association Regular Baptist Association {Kentucky}. When the Twin Creek Association of Old Regular Baptist dissolved, the remaining  Churches went into the North District Association by letter. 
  
The Mud River Association originated from a split in the Pocatalico Particular Baptist Association in 1888. The Mud River used the title "Primitive Baptist" in correspondence with the New Salem Association for many years and later titled itself Regular or Old Regular Baptist.
The Sandlick Regular Primitive Association and the Mates Creek Regular Primitive Baptist are both descendants of the New Salem Old Regular Baptist Association. These Associations and the Burning Springs Association all used the name "Regular" and "Old Regular" along with Primitive interchangeably.
The word old was added to Regular Baptist soon after many Regular Baptists had joined and began to correspond with mission boards. This was done to distinguish the Old (or original) Regular Baptists from the New School Baptists that had emerged throughout the United States. The terms "Old School", "Old Regular", "Old Order", and "Primitive" came into usage during the same time period and were being added to the Baptist name to show they were of the old form of worship and had rejected what they considered modern innovations such as Sunday or Sabbath Schools, theological seminaries, missions boards and the like.

The Old Regular Baptist in the late 1800s became concerned over the doctrines of "Absolute" Predestination of all things both good and evil,  Actual Eternal Vital Union,[ Eternal Children Doctrine] and the Atonement.  The Minutes of the New Salem Association in the year of 1892 stated that the New Salem Association feared the doctrine of an "Absolute" Predestination of all things that made God the author of man sins and the doctrine of  Arminianism that taught the works of the creature to be essential to eternal salvation.  A circular letter in the Three Forks of Powell River began to circulate supporting Actual Eternal Vital Union. Debates in the Pulpit became more frequent as Brothers became more extreme in their views.

The Old Regular Baptists of Central Appalachia have, in fact, experienced several different divisions through the years over doctrine and practice. In the late 19th century to early 20th century, they had major splits over the doctrine of Absolute Predestination of all things and  Actual Eternal Vital Union and Eternal Creation theories; this was the cause of their largest split ever, in combination with their  differences over the Atonement and Election doctrines that escalated splits and divisions. Three of New Salem's daughters, the Union, the Mates Creek, and the Sandlick, divided. The New Salem also dropped correspondence with the Burning Springs Association, her mother, because she had members that belonged to secret orders.  The United Baptist Associations were dropped for Secret Order and Mourners Benches. In the 1960s, a debate started over when eternal life began. Was  regeneration the new birth before belief and repentance[conversion] or after faith and repentance[conversion].   There are Old Regular Baptists that hold the same views as other Primitive Baptists  bodies[ both Old Line and Absolute Predestination Primitive Baptist ] on regeneration that one is regenerated instantaneously on hearing the Voice of the Son of God [John 5:25] These Old School Regular Baptist hold strictly that eternal life and  salvation are given first in a free gift by the grace of God and that the elect are  called by a holy calling.(II Timothy 1:9) This effectual call is referenced as the "Light of Christ" doctrine (I Peter 2:9) also known as the "Light is Life" doctrine. This view teaches that faith and repentance are the effects of regeneration and not the cause of regeneration. They hold that the individual is quickened by the Spirit and has eternal or everlasting life prior to belief and repentance the gospel brings life and immortality to light but has no part in regeneration. Regeneration is  first then Conversion is manifested by true faith and repentance in which a Godly sorrow sets up in the quickened individual's heart and they are sorrowed to repentance and mourning in which after the Godly sorrow has sorrowed them to repentance  they  profess a burden of sin being removed and take comfort in the gospel and express an experience of grace.  Old Regular Baptist holding those views Monergism are often derided as the  "Hardshell Side". The Synergist side holding that a man must repent and believe in order to be regenerated,  and that through the Creature obeying, making up his mind, taking heed to the light and call, he then being enabled by grace and the light that leads one to life. They reject an effectual call and light is not synonymous with life, the creature can reject the light and be lost eternally, light and life are separate entities, this is referred to as the "Softshell Side"[see Fullerites]. There is one side of the Synergistic Old Regular Baptist that teaches that God dealt to everyman universally a " measure of faith" and it must be put to work by the creature in order for salvation to occur. This teaching has been recorded in the minutes of some of the Conditional Salvation advocates Annual Association Minutes. There are ministers  within the Old Regular Baptist that  hold the " Duty Faith" and  "The Measure of Faith" doctrines as heresy and claim it was invented in the 1960s in Southwestern Virginia, after the light of Christ division came about, any prior reference to the terminology in Old Regular Baptist records or usage  has the measure of faith as a gift to the regenerated and not the unregenerated.

The Old Regular Baptists are a  branch of  Primitive Baptists [primitivism] that clearly rejected modern innovations such as Sunday Schools, Tract Societies, Mission Boards they held to a more historical style of early Baptist worship and stricter gospel order. The Old Regular Baptist in Appalachia were more tolerant in doctrine, originally allowing for different views on the atonement. [This stems from an earlier agreement made by the Regular and Separate Baptist when forming the United Baptist in Kentucky] While the doctrine of some traditional Old Regular Baptists [Gillites] would be in harmony with the London or Philadelphia Confessions of Faith advocating Limited or Particular Atonement, others among the Old Regulars hold to a more modified Calvinism and to Andrew Fuller's view of the atonement, Universal/Limited [see Fullerism or Fullerites] and yet there are some ministers and members that hold to a modified General Atonement. The original compromise on the Atonement made by the Regular and Separate Baptist was never kept, it then led to doctrinal splits, on the Atonement issue, these divisions were widespread throughout Appalachia. Statements were made by some of the Mountain Associations, that Christ made a full atonement for all those that have believed and those that will believe and that these believers were the elect chosen in Christ before the foundation of the world. This statement seemed to satisfy the different factions for a while. The Red Bird and Red River and Spencer, Sandlick, Mates Creek, Burning Springs, Mountain, Rock Springs, North District, Licking, with parts of the New Salem and Union along with Mud River,
Twin Creek  Associations of Old Regular Baptist held to Special or Limited Atonement. Strict Particular Atonement was the doctrine of the majority side of Mates Creek and Sandlick Associations and part of the Union Association at the time of the great divide it was the historical view of the Washington, Pocatalico, Three Forks of Powell River and the Elkhorn of West Virginia's view. The New Salem Association corresponded with the limited atonement side of the Union Association after the split and then later switched sides, and took correspondence with the side holding more to a Fullerite View, Elder J.C Swindle [from Three Forks of Powell Valley] and Elder N.T Hopkins[New Salem] were champions of Andrew Fuller's Atonement view to the point that Elder  N.T Hopkins declared the Fullerite {General} view to be the doctrine of the New Salem Association from the Pulpit this caused several delegates representing their home churches within the New Salem to abruptly leave the Association with their Church letters in hand, along with other Sister Old Regular Baptist Association's delegates with their Association letters. These delegates and Churches and Associations all holding to a Strict or Special  Limited atonement. One of the  New Salem Association's oldest Churches the Stone Coal Church of Garrett, Kentucky walked out and eventually divided into two bodies an Absolute Predestination side and Limited Predestination side. The Limited predestination side believed that God predestinated the salvation of his elect people and that the saving of his people by his grace, but denied, that every event that occurs in time was predestinated, they believed in a Common Salvation [timely or in time that involved actions of the creature]  and an eternal salvation [that was the sole work of the creator with no action of the creature] The Absolute Predestination side held every event that came to past was predestinated of God. Amazing after several years apart under the Ministry of Elder Marion Chaffins both factions came back together. Several of the Churches that walked out after N.T Hopkins sermon were reconciled back to the New Salem Association the ministers decided among themselves to just preach the scriptures and that Christ died for all that believe and repent through Grace. The New Salem Association at one time contained ministers holding to three different views on the atonement and was thereafter, able to navigate fairly peaceful. During the 1960s  The " Light of Christ" or " Light is Life' split [Light is Life teaches immediate spontaneous regeneration] this division took place in the  Union Association of Old Regular Baptist[New Salem Correspondence] 1961-1962 this doctrine was an argument over when eternal life was given, both sides held it was a gift given in time.  This was the second time the Union Association had a large division over doctrine, [they had endured a previous split over Actual Eternal Vital Union and Absolute Predestination of all things both good and evil] the fallout of the Light of Christ  division soon spread to other associations being  brought on by requests sent to them from the Union Association. This split resulted in the isolation of the Mud River Association which advocated regeneration prior to faith and repentance, and the formation of the Bethel. The Elders in the Mud River Association were more sympathetic to the  doctrine of the six churches that left the Union Association. The Union Association's act of expulsion of the Bold Camp Church was considered a violation of the Union's Constitution by most Elders versed in discipline. There were seven churches that left the Union Association[ Bold Camp, Bethel, Mount Olive, Hylton, Longs Fork, Turner, Rose Hill] and others who felt the Union dismissed Bold Camp in error. The seven churches that left formed the Bethel Association of Old Regular Baptist.  The New Salem Association leadership, seeing the chaos in the Union Association chose not to divide over this issue [Light and Life]. Today there are still debates among the Old Regular Baptists Churches over when one receives faith, men and women's dress, the receiving of divorced members, and the doctrinal differences over hope and knowledge. Some Old Regular Baptist do hold to some points of Arminianism vs others who are more Calvinistic. There are several factions of Old Regular Baptist at present, including the "Old" Regular Primitive Baptist who include the Mother Association[Burning Springs]  and Daughter Associations of the New Salem [Mates Creek, Sandlick and Union]. There remains Churches and Associations that remain in direct doctrinal sympathy with the Old Line Primitive Baptist. There are factions of Old Regular Baptist that are in doctrinal sympathy with the  "Old" United Baptist. These "Old" United Baptist share the same heritage as the Old Regular and Primitive Baptist Churches and are Old School in practice [The Separate Baptist and   Particular (Regular) Baptists].

In the 1990s, a debate arose in the Northern New Salem over one of its member churches' use of fermented wine in communion (wine was the original Regular Baptist custom) vs. grape juice. A query was sent into the association by a sister church against the church that used wine. All evidence shows that the church that sent the query had not taken the proper steps according to Old Regular Baptist decorum. The Association involved itself, failing to send the query back to the church that sent it, and violated its own orders. This led to two member churches breaking fellowship with the Northern New Salem. The two member churches, and one formed later, lettered to the Original Mountain Liberty Association and was found to be orthodox and orderly and were dismissed to form the Sovereign Grace Association in 1997. The Sovereign Grace Association's doctrine would be in total harmony with the Old Line Primitive Baptists of today or close to the Original Philadelphia Association of the past.

Faith and practice

The theology of the Old Regular Baptists is "election by grace", as stated in the scripture: "By Grace are ye saved through faith." While all Old Regulars preach "election by grace", a difference of opinion exists among them concerning election and predestination. Today, depending on which faction you hear preach, their doctrine ranges from absolute predestination to man being a free moral agent. The majority of Old Regular Baptists hold to a doctrine that is between these extremes, with absolutism the smallest minority. The Old Regular Baptist are united in their eschatology, all factions hold that the binding of Satan took place during Christ's earthly ministry and that  the thousand years is to be taken symbolically as it represents a period of time. That there will be a Last Day and General Judgement [an hour in which all the dead be  will raise the just and unjust]. Old Regular Baptist all believe in experimental grace, baptism by immersion, a called and regularly ordained ministry. Old Regular Baptist factions are in agreement believing that Christ is the Eternal Son of God, that he is now and has been and  always will be Christ. Old Regular Baptist hold to the Godhead [being three in one], The Scriptures Old and New Testament being the written Word of God and infallibility thereof, [King James is the only English version used] Sinners are called to Repentance, that both faith and repentance are required prior to baptism, justification is by the Imputed Righteousness of God.

Churches form local associations by which they fellowship with one another. This fellowship is formally maintained by the election of correspondents to attend the meetings of the other associations. Preachers are God-called (not trained by man), unpaid, and preach improvisational (often chanted) sermons. Baptism (in running water), the Lord's supper and feet washing are held to be ordinances. Shouting is a frequent occurrence at an Old Regular meeting, particularly among the female membership. Conversion experiences may be a lengthy process, beginning with an awakening to sin, through a period of conviction and travail of the soul, to repentance and belief.

Lined-out hymnody
One noted feature that has gained much attention to the Old Regular Baptists is their lined-out, non-instrumental, congregational hymnody. According to Jeff Titon, "The leader sings the very first line, and the congregation joins in when they recognize the song. After that, the song proceeds line by line: the leader briefly chants a line alone, and then the group repeats the words but to a tune that is much longer and more elaborate than the leader's chant or lining tune." E. D. Thomas' Hymns and Spiritual Songs (1877) and Edward W. Billups' The Sweet Songster (1854) are two of several "words-only" hymn books preferred by these churches. The practice of lining out psalms and hymns was once common across Britain and America. In the British Isles, but the only remaining vestige of the tradition can be found in the Outer Hebrides of Scotland, where it is done in Gaelic.

Current status

The strength of Old Regular Baptists is in Appalachia, particularly along the Kentucky and Virginia border, although Old Regular Baptist churches exist as far north as Michigan and as far south as Florida, and several churches still exist in the state of Washington. Currently, there are eight local associations in the New Salem correspondence, New Salem, Northern New Salem, Old Friendship, Old Indian Bottom, Philadelphia, Sardis, Union. The Indian Bottom, Sovereign Grace, Mountain #1 and Mountain #2  Friendship, Bethel are Independent bodies no longer associated with the New Salem cluster. These 14 associations and independent churches (not lettered to an association) contain over 350 churches with over 6,000 members.  The folk singer Jean Ritchie was a member of the Old Regular Baptists in Kentucky.

Citations

External links
Appalachian Music
Historical Sketch
Indian Bottom Association of Old Regular Baptists
Information on Lined-Out Hymnody
Old Regular Baptist Research - ASU
Sovereign Grace Association of Old Regular Baptist
Old Regular Baptist Association History
 A Conjoining of Ancient Song
 "Public Enemies - Guide Me O thou Great Jehovah"
 "Celebrating Congregational Line Singing"
 Berea College - Lined Out Hymnody

Christianity in Appalachia
Religion in the Southern United States
Religious organizations established in 1825
Baptist denominations in North America
1825 establishments in the United States